József Darányi (28 September 1905 in Devecser – 23 December 1990 in Veresegyház) was a Hungarian shot putter who competed in the 1928 Summer Olympics, in the 1932 Summer Olympics, and in the 1936 Summer Olympics.

Darányi broke the world record in both-handed shot put (an event in which the shot was thrown with the right hand and separately with the left hand, and the best results for each hand were added together) on three occasions. He first broke Ralph Rose's world record of 28.00 m in June 1931, achieving a total of 28.04 m (14.80 m/13.24 m). Three months later he improved to 28.67 m (15.43 m/13.24 m). Darányi lost the record to Jack Torrance in 1934, but regained it the following year with a total of 29.46 m (15.77 m/13.69 m), his eventual best.

References

1905 births
1990 deaths
Hungarian male shot putters
Olympic athletes of Hungary
Athletes (track and field) at the 1928 Summer Olympics
Athletes (track and field) at the 1932 Summer Olympics
Athletes (track and field) at the 1936 Summer Olympics
Sportspeople from Veszprém County
People from Veresegyház
Sportspeople from Pest County